Where You At? is a 2002 album by American singer-songwriter Amanda Perez. It was released on April 30 of that year by Universal, and features the hit single "Never". Several of the songs were later featured on her 2003 album "Angel", including "Angel", "Where You At", "In My Life", and "I Like It".

Reception
AllMusic's Dan LeRoy called Perez "considerably more advanced than most of her musical peers."  He praised the music, which he called "a chart-conscious blend of hip-hop bangers and R&B ballads that sounds like it could slide into heavy rotation between Ja Rule and J. Lo without making anyone blink."

Track listing
All songs written by Amanda Perez.
 "Intro" – 1:19
 "Where You At?" – 3:17
 "I Like It" – 4:14
 "Whoa" – 3:28
 "Never" – 4:15
 "No More" – 3:49
 "Get 'Em Hype" – 3:26
 "Angel" – 3:38
 "Your Body Is Mine" – 3:34
 "Too Tee Zee" – 3:47
 "I Still Love You" – 3:53
 "In My Life" – 3:32
 "Love Is Pain" – 3:21

Personnel
Amanda Perez: Keyboards, piano, synthesized bass, drum and rhythm programming
P. Tony: Additional drum and rhythm programming

Production
Executive producer: Jethro Beau Tea
Arranged by Amanda Perez, P. Tony and Harold Road
Main production by Amanda Perez
Additional production by Mike G., Mike Q., P. Tony and Harold Road
Recorded and engineered by Theresa Farrell, Jon Hayes and Brent Miller
Mixed by David "D-Lo" Lopez
Mastered by Chris Bellman

References

2002 albums
Amanda Perez albums
Universal Records albums